German submarine U-480 was an experimental Kriegsmarine Type VIIC U-boat of World War II.

Considered by many to be the first stealth submarine, it was equipped with a special rubber skin of anechoic tiles (codenamed Alberich, after the German mythological character who had the ability to become invisible), that made it difficult to detect with Allies' ASDIC (sonar).

The U-boat was laid down in the Deutsche Werke in Kiel as yard number 311 on 8 December 1942, launched on 14 August 1943 and commissioned on 6 October 1943 under Oberleutnant zur See Hans-Joachim Förster. U-480 carried out three war patrols, all under Förster's command. Because of its coating, the boat was sent to the heavily defended English Channel.

She was one of about 6 Type VIIs that the Kriegsmarine fitted with an experimental synthetic rubber skin of anechoic tiles.

Design 
German Type VIIC submarines were preceded by the shorter Type VIIB submarines. U-480 had a displacement of  when at the surface and  while submerged. She had two shafts and two  propellers.

U-480 was fitted with five  torpedo tubes (four fitted at the bow and one at the stern), fourteen torpedoes, one  SK C/35 naval gun, (220 rounds), one  Flak M42 and two twin  C/30 anti-aircraft guns. The boat had a complement of between forty-four and sixty.

Anechoic coating 

Rubber foil containing air holes can be used to reduce the sound waves reflected under water by structures when foil thickness is small by comparison with the sound wavelength in water, providing a low reflectivity over a narrow frequency range.

The leading German acoustician Erik Meyer and his team developed a 4-millimetre (0.16 in) thick tile consisting of two 2-millimetre thick foils of synthetic rubber. The anechoic tile reduced echoes by 15% in the 10 to 18 kHz range. This frequency range matched the operating range of the early ASDIC active sonar used by the Allies. The ASDIC types 123, 123A, 144 and 145 all operated in the 14 to 22 kHz range. However, this degradation in echo reflection was not uniform at all diving depths due to the voids being compressed by the water pressure. An additional benefit of the coating was it acted as a sound dampener, containing the U-boat's own engine noises.

The rubber contained a series of holes, which helped break up sound waves. There were problems with this technology: the material performed differently at different depths, due to the holes being compressed by water pressure, and securing the tiles to the submarine's hull required a special adhesive and careful application.

The first tests were conducted in 1940, but it was not used operationally until 1944, with U-480. According to the Naked Science television episode "Stealth Submarine", U-480 had a perforated inner rubber layer covered by a smooth outer one. This formed air pockets with the right separation and size to muffle sonar waves.

With the exception of U-480 and U-486, none of the other German submarines of this type with this equipment was lost in combat.

Service history 
On its first patrol, the boat was attacked by a Canadian PBY Catalina flying boat of 162 Squadron RCAF, piloted by Laurance Sherman. The aircraft was shot down.

On the second patrol, Förster departed from Brest in occupied France on 3 August 1944, and sank two warships and two merchantmen:

For his success, Förster was awarded the Knight's Cross on 18 October 1944.

Fate 
U-480 left Trondheim, Norway, on 6 January 1945 for its third and last patrol. It did not return. The following year, it was correctly identified as the Alberich-coated U-480 by nautical archaeologist Innes McCartney. Subsequent research by the Naval Historical Branch established that it had fallen victim to the secret minefield 'Brazier D2' sometime between 29 January and 20 February. A mine had damaged the stern of U-480, sending it to the bottom  down. The entire crew of 48 was lost. Helmsman Horst Rösner only survived because he had been left behind in Norway for training.

Summary of raiding history

See also 
Anechoic tile

References

Notes

Citations

Bibliography

External links 

"Stealth Submarine", part of a National Geographic Channel documentary television episode on U-480

German Type VIIC submarines
U-boats commissioned in 1943
U-boats sunk by mines
U-boats sunk in 1945
World War II submarines of Germany
World War II shipwrecks in the English Channel
1943 ships
Experimental submarines
Ships built in Kiel
Ships lost with all hands
Maritime incidents in January 1945